Talya Lador-Fresher (born 1962 in Petah Tikva) is an Israeli diplomat who is chargé d'affaires in France after having been the Ambassador to Austria since November 2015 and permanent representative to the international organisations in Vienna (UNIDO and OSCE). She replaced Zvi Heifetz. Lador-Fresher was Chief of State Protocol and Head of the Protocol and Official Guests Bureau, from 2010 to 2015 at the Ministry of Foreign Affairs and from 2006 to 2010, Minister Plenipotentiary, Embassy of the State of Israel in London, United Kingdom.

She has a Bachelor of Arts degree in business administration and political science from Hebrew University, Jerusalem (1987).

References

Israeli women ambassadors
Ambassadors of Israel to Austria
Ambassadors of Israel to the United Kingdom
People from Petah Tikva
Jerusalem School of Business Administration alumni
Ambassadors of Israel to France
1962 births
Living people
Hebrew University of Jerusalem Faculty of Social Sciences alumni